Bruno Bayen (13 November 1950 – 6 December 2016) was a French novelist, playwright and theatre director.

Early life
Bruno Bayen was born on 13 November 1950 in Paris. His father worked as the rector of the University of Strasbourg. With his four siblings, he grew up in Clermont-Ferrand and Strasbourg.

Bayen graduated from the École Normale Supérieure.

Career
Bayen founded La Fabrique, a theatre company, and directed several plays for five years. In 1972, he directed his first play, Le Pied by Victor Hugo. Two years later, in 1975, he was appointed as co-director of the Grenier de Toulouse, a theatre in Toulouse, alongside Maurice Sarrazin. However, he stepped down in 1978. Over the course of his career, he went on to direct 30 plays, some of his own as well as plays by German playwrights Frank Wedekind, Georg Büchner, Rainer Werner Fassbinder and Johann Wolfgang von Goethe.

Bayen was the author of more than a dozen books, including novels, plays and essays. He was also a German-to-French translator. For example, he translated the works of Peter Handke into French. In 2006, he was disinvited from a talk at the Comédie-Française for his ties to Handke, who had attended Serbian dictator Slobodan Milosevic's funeral.

Bayen was also the author of two libretti: Schliemann, composed by Betsy Jolas, in 1995; and Jusqu’à l’extinction des consignes lumineuses, composed by Arrigo Barnabé, in 2005.

Death
Bayen died on 6 December 2016.

Works

Novels

Plays

References

1950 births
2016 deaths
Writers from Paris
École Normale Supérieure alumni
French male novelists
20th-century French novelists
20th-century French male writers
21st-century French novelists
20th-century French dramatists and playwrights
21st-century French dramatists and playwrights
French opera directors
French non-fiction writers
21st-century French male writers
French male non-fiction writers
20th-century French translators
Theatre directors from Paris